Bastion House is an office block in the Barbican area of the City of London, England. The building was designed by Powell & Moya and completed in 1976. It has 17 storeys.

Its basement contains the remains of a tower which formed part of the west gate of a Roman fort protecting Londinium.  It contained a sentry post and access to the walkway of London Wall.  This is often open to the public.

In 2022, plans by the City of London Corporation to demolish the building along with the Museum of London and construct a new office building on the site were opposed by locals, with 88% voting for alternative plans.

References 

Office buildings in London
Office buildings completed in 1976
1976 establishments in England
Barbican Estate